Chadi Karnib (born 1 January 1975) is a Lebanese former footballer who played as a midfielder. He represented the Lebanon national team during the late 1990s.

Personal life 
Karnib retired from football aged 25 after suffering from chronic injuries. He then moved to Australia, where he is currently living as of 2019. He has two children, a son and a daughter, both of whom play football. Karnib's son, Abbas, represented Lebanon internationally at under-20 level.

Honours 
Individual
 Lebanese Premier League Team of the Season: 1997–98, 1998–99

References

External links
 

Living people
1975 births
Footballers from Beirut
Lebanese footballers
Association football midfielders
Lebanese Premier League players
Safa SC players
Sagesse SC footballers
Lebanon international footballers